The Venturers is a British television series produced by the BBC in 1975.

The series, created by Donald Bull, had started out as an edition of Drama Playhouse in 1972 before being commissioned as an ongoing series. The Venturers took place in the high pressure world of Prince's merchant bank and dealt with the intricacies of high finance amongst its millionaire clients.

Geoffrey Keen starred as director Gerald Lang, in a virtual reprise of his role as oil executive Brian Stead in Mogul / The Troubleshooters. Other major cast members included James Kerry, David Buck, Cyril Luckham and William Squire.

The Venturers lasted for a single series of ten episodes.

Cast
 Geoffrey Keen as Gerald Lang  
 David Buck as Tom Prince 
 James Kerry as David Ayrton 
 Karin MacCarthy as Dorothy Ayrton
 Hugh Manning as Freddie Pander
 Cyril Luckham as Lord Kilvern
 William Squire as Sir George Fielding

External links
 

BBC television dramas
1970s British drama television series
1975 British television series debuts
1975 British television series endings
English-language television shows